In philately, a pull is created when an impression of a handstamp or die is made.

The wording or design of a handstamp or die appears in reverse when viewing the original so it is necessary to make a pull on to paper to view the image as it will appear in use.

Pulls are made of die proofs in order to check progress when engraving a stamp.

References

Philatelic terminology